Vernon Stephens (born December 14, 1957) is an American politician. He is a member of the South Carolina Senate from the 39th District, serving since 2021. He is a member of the Democratic party.

Stephens serves as the Parliamentarian of the South Carolina Legislative Black Caucus.

Electoral history

2020 South Carolina Senate
This seat was one of three open seats in this election cycle. Stephens was one of four candidates to run in the Democratic primary, finishing first to advance to a runoff against Cindy Evans.

References

Living people
1957 births
Democratic Party South Carolina state senators
21st-century American politicians
People from Orangeburg, South Carolina